Bages is a comarca (county)  in the center of Catalonia, Spain. It includes a subcomarca, Lluçanès.

Industries include the mining of potash at Súria and Sallent, and the manufacture of textiles along the rivers Llobregat and Cardener. Agriculture includes vineyards, cereals, and olive groves.

To the north are Berguedà and (running clockwise) Osona, Moianès, and Vallès Occidental. To the south are Baix Llobregat, l'Anoia and el Solsonès.

In May 2015, Bages lost five municipalities - Calders, L'Estany, Moià, Monistrol de Calders, Santa Maria d'Oló - to the new comarca of Moianès.

Municipalities

References

External links
Official comarcal web site, in Catalan
Information on Bages from the Generalitat de Catalunya (government of Catalonia), in Catalan

 
Comarques of the Province of Barcelona